Lonesome Luke on Tin Can Alley is a 1917 American short comedy film starring Harold Lloyd. A print of the film survives in the film archive of the Museum of Modern Art.

Cast
 Harold Lloyd - Lonesome Luke
 Bebe Daniels - Bebe
 Snub Pollard
 Marie Mosquini
 S.B. Smith
 Margaret Joslin - (as Margaret Joslin Todd)
 Harry Todd
 Joe Turner
 Sammy Brooks
 Bud Jamison - Cafe owner
 W.L. Adams
 Elmer Ballard
 Billy Fay
 Fred C. Newmeyer
 Gus Leonard
 Gilbert Pratt
 Charles Stevenson
 Dorothea Wolbert
 Earl Mohan

See also
 Harold Lloyd filmography

References

External links

1917 films
1917 short films
American silent short films
1917 comedy films
American black-and-white films
Films directed by Hal Roach
Silent American comedy films
Lonesome Luke films
American comedy short films
1910s American films